Cychrus evae is a species of ground beetle in the subfamily of Carabinae. It was described by Haeckel & Sehnal in 2007.

References

evae
Beetles described in 2007